Nimbus Sans is a sans-serif typeface created by URW++, based on Helvetica.

Nimbus Sans
It is a version using URW++ font source. The family supports Western Europe, East Europe, Turkish, Baltic, and Romanian languages.

The font names ending with (D) have slightly lighter font weights and tighter spacing.

Nimbus Sans Poster
It is a version of Nimbus Sans with even tighter spacing than the Nimbus Sans (D) fonts. Other changes include alternate designs for currency symbols.

Nimbus Sans Diagonal
It is a version with more right lean than Nimbus Sans italic fonts. The family currently only includes 1 font, in Black weight in medium width.

Nimbus Sans Mono
It is a monospaced variant of Nimbus Sans. The family currently only includes 1 font, in Regular weight in medium width.

Nimbus Sans Global
It is a family supporting Latin, Greek, Cyrillic, CJK ideographic, Japanese kana, Korean Hangul syllables, Thai characters. The family includes 5 fonts in 1 (medium) width, with 4 proportional and 1 monospaced fonts. The proportional fonts are in 4 weights (bold, medium, regular, light), while the monospace font is in medium weight.

Nimbus Sans L
Nimbus Sans L is a version of Nimbus Sans using Adobe font sources. It was designed in 1987. The family includes 17 fonts in 5 weights and 2 widths, with Nimbus Sans L Extra Black only available in condensed roman format.

A subset of Nimbus Sans L, which includes regular and bold weight fonts in all widths and styles, were released under the GPL and AFPL in Type 1 format in 1996 and LPPL in 2009, and is one of several freely licensed fonts offered by URW++.

Although the characters are not exactly the same, Nimbus Sans L has metrics almost identical to Helvetica and Arial. Nimbus Sans L is one of the Ghostscript fonts, a set of free alternatives to the 35 basic PostScript fonts (which include Helvetica).

It is a standard typeface in many Linux distributions. It was used as default font in OpenOffice.org Calc and Impress in some Linux distributions (e.g. Ubuntu - up to version 8.10; since Ubuntu 9.04 the default font was changed to Liberation Sans).

Ghostscript version
It was extended to include Cyrillic support by Valek Filippov.

Nimbus Sans Novus
It is a version Linotype's Stempel Studio source, based on Neue Helvetica, but without the extended fonts.

The font names ending with (D) have tighter letter spacing.

See also
Nimbus Roman No9 L
Nimbus Mono L
Free software Unicode typefaces

References

External links

Nimbus Sans
URW pages: 
 Nimbus Sans Family, 
 Nimbus Sans Global
Nimbus Sans on MyFonts
URW fonts sources on Ghostscript  (Type 1, OTF and TTF fonts)

Nimbus Sans L
URW pages: Nimbus Sans L
URW fonts releases
Fonts and font facilities supplied with Ghostscript (Type 1)

Nimbus Sans Novus
URW pages: Nimbus Sans Novus

Neo-grotesque sans-serif typefaces
Open-source typefaces
Typefaces and fonts introduced in 1999